Abdellah Haidane (born 28 March 1989) is a Moroccan-born Italian middle distance runner.

Biography
He is coached by historian coach of Alberto Cova, Giorgio Rondelli. His personal best in 1500 metres indoor is the ninth best Italian performance of all-time.

In 2014 Haidane tested positive for the stimulant Tuaminoheptane and was banned from sports for four months.

Achievements

National titles
He has won 4 times the individual national championship.
1 win in the 1500 metres indoor (2014)
3 win in the 3000 metres indoor (2012, 2013, 2014)

References

External links
 

1989 births
Doping cases in athletics
Italian male middle-distance runners
Italian sportspeople in doping cases
Living people
Naturalised citizens of Italy
People from El Kelaa des Sraghna
Moroccan emigrants to Italy
Italian sportspeople of African descent